is a side-scrolling platform game developed and published by Konami for the Super Nintendo Entertainment System. The game, the only one in the series to be released on a Nintendo console, was directed by Hideo Ueda and was released in Japan on September 1994, in North America in October 1994, in Europe in 1994.

Sparkster is a sequel to the original Rocket Knight Adventures the Sega Genesis, though it is a different game than the similarly titled Genesis sequel, Sparkster: Rocket Knight Adventures 2.

Gameplay 

The eponymous main character is an opossum knight named Sparkster who fights an army of yellow wolves and robots. He is armed with a sword that can fire energy bolts and a rocket pack that allows him to fly short distances. The gameplay remains mostly the same as in Mega Drive/Genesis games, with the most notable change being the addition of a short-distance rolling dash. At the end of every level, Sparkster battles a boss, and the level is complete when it is defeated. The 3rd (2nd in Easy) stage consists of Sparkster riding a robot-ostrich in an auto-scrolling level, while the 7th (5th in Easy) consists of a top-down shooter level. One major difference is that the game's final level depends on the difficulty the player selected. On easy, the game culminates with battle against Axel Gear, but on normal, the story continues with Sparkster fighting the leader of the Wolves on the next level. On hard difficulty, the game continues beyond that, with the true final stage.

Plot 
The kingdom of Eginasem, a land inhabited by opossums, is under attack by the Lioness's army of yellow dog and wolf soldiers, which also kidnapped Princess Flora. Sparkster, the Rocket Knight, is out to battle this threat, rescue the princess and save his kingdom from certain destruction. His nemesis, the rival Rocket Knight Axel Gear, is aiding the invading forces, making Sparkster's task even more dangerous. The player's goal is to battle through all of the enemy warriors and robots, defeat Axel Gear and infiltrate the enemy's battleship, where the yellow dogs leader, Generalissimo Lioness, is planning to launch a warhead to destroy planet Eginasem.

Reception 

GamePro rated the game positively, but mentioned that it was not a strong enough improvement from the original Rocket Knight Adventures, criticizing the lack of an improved control scheme and new weapons and powerups. However, they praised the impressive graphics, moody music, and the two secret hard modes. Electronic Gaming Monthly gave it an 8.2 out of 10, saying that it shows Konami "back to form" with "huge levels, gigantic bosses, outstanding graphics and excellent music." Power Unlimited gave a score of 76% concluding: "One of the better games for the Mega Drive now for the SNES. The levels look very special and are well put together. There are many, and also quite intelligent, enemies. Great class."

Sparkster was awarded Best Sound Effects of 1994 by Electronic Gaming Monthly. IGN placed the game 87th in their "Top 100 SNES Games of All Time." In 1995, Total! listed the game 74th in its Top 100 SNES Games writing: "Konami come up trumps again with this gorgeous looking platform blaster. A huge challenge too."

References

External links 
 
 Sparkster at superfamicom.org
 スパークスター / Sparkster at super-famicom.jp 
 Sparkster series review  at Hardcore Gaming 101

1994 video games
Konami games
Fictional marsupials
Fictional opossums
Platform games
Side-scrolling video games
Steampunk video games
Super Nintendo Entertainment System games
Super Nintendo Entertainment System-only games
Video games scored by Akira Yamaoka
Video games scored by Michiru Yamane
Single-player video games
Video games developed in Japan